Roman Schramseis (29 March 1906 – 10 December 1988) was an Austrian footballer. He was the father of Roman Schramseis, Jr.

References

External links
 Rapid Archiv

1906 births
1988 deaths
Austrian footballers
Austria international footballers
Association football defenders
SK Rapid Wien players
FC Rouen players